Sandy Burrell (born 25 May 1955) is a Scottish former professional footballer, who played as a defender for Heart of Midlothian ("Hearts"), Falkirk and Meadowbank Thistle. Burrell played for Hearts in the 1976 Scottish Cup Final, which they lost 3–1 to Rangers.

References

1955 births
Living people
Footballers from Edinburgh
Scottish footballers
Association football fullbacks
Heart of Midlothian F.C. players
Falkirk F.C. players
Livingston F.C. players
Newtongrange Star F.C. players
Scottish Football League players